Micronesians settled the Marshall Islands in the 2nd millennium BC, but there are no historical or oral records of that period. Over time, the Marshallese people learned to navigate over long ocean distances by canoe using traditional stick charts.

Spanish colony 

Spanish explorer Alonso de Salazar was the first European to see the islands in 1526, commanding the ship Santa Maria de la Victoria, the only surviving vessel of the Loaísa Expedition. On August 21, he sighted an island (probably Taongi) at 14°N that he named "San Bartolome".

On September 21, 1529, Álvaro de Saavedra Cerón commanded the Spanish ship Florida, on his second attempt to recross the Pacific from the Maluku Islands. He stood off a group of islands from which local inhabitants hurled stones at his ship. These islands, which he named "Los Pintados", may have been Ujelang. On October 1, he found another group of islands where he went ashore for eight days, exchanged gifts with the local inhabitants and took on water. These islands, which he named "Los Jardines", may have been Enewetak or Bikini Atoll.

The Spanish ship San Pedro and two other vessels in an expedition commanded by Miguel López de Legazpi discovered an island on January 9, 1530, possibly Mejit, at 10°N, which they named "Los Barbudos". The Spaniards went ashore and traded with the local inhabitants. On January 10, the Spaniards sighted another island that they named "Placeres", perhaps Ailuk; ten leagues away, they sighted another island that they called "Pajares" (perhaps Jemo). On January 12, they sighted another island at 10°N that they called "Corrales" (possibly Wotho). On January 15, the Spaniards sighted another low island, perhaps Ujelang, at 10°N, where they described the people on "Barbudos". After that, ships including the San Jeronimo, Los Reyes and Todos los Santos also visited the islands in different years.

The islanders had no immunity to European diseases and many died as a result of contact with the Spanish.

Other European contacts 

Captain John Charles Marshall and Thomas Gilbert visited the islands in 1788. The islands were named for Marshall on Western charts, although the indigenous peoples have historically named their home "jolet jen Anij" (Gifts from God).  Around 1820, Russian explorer Adam Johann von Krusenstern and the French explorer Louis Isidore Duperrey named the islands after John Marshall, and drew maps of the islands. British maps later repeated the designation. In 1824 the crew of the American whaler Globe mutinied and some of the crew put ashore on Mulgrave Island. One year later, the American schooner Dolphin arrived and picked up two boys, the last survivors of a massacre by the natives due to their brutal treatment of the women.

A number of vessels visiting the islands were attacked and their crews killed. In 1834 Captain DonSette and his crew were killed. Similarly, in 1845 the schooner Naiad punished a native for stealing with such violence that natives attacked the ship. Later that year a whaler's boat-crew were killed. In 1852 the San Francisco-based ships Glencoe and Sea Nymph were attacked and everyone aboard except for one crew member were killed. The violence was usually attributed as a response to the ill-treatment of the natives in response to petty theft, which was a common practice. In 1857 two missionaries successfully settled on Ebon, living among the natives through at least 1870.

The international community in 1874 recognized the Spanish Empire's claim of sovereignty over the islands as part of the Spanish East Indies.

German protectorate

The first documented German to visit the Marshall Islands, Adolph Capelle, arrived in Ebon from pre-colonial Samoa in 1859. Jose deBrum, a Portuguese whaler, arrived in 1864, and the two established a trading post on Ebon and married local women.

Several German companies began to arrive in the Marshall Islands, chiefly among them Godeffroy & Son of Hamburg, which pioneered the production of copra on Ebon in the 1870s; Godeffroy & Son later expanded tradition stations to Jaluit, Maloelap, Mili, and Namdrik, with another German company, Hernsheim & Co., also trading from Jaluit. The Capelle-deBrum partnership began the most profitable copra production on Likiep.

Although the Spanish Empire had a residual claim on the Marshall Islands in 1874, when Spain began asserting its sovereignty over the Carolines, it made no effort to prevent the German Empire from gaining a foothold there. Britain also raised no objection to a German protectorate over the Marshall Islands in exchange for German recognition of Britain's rights in the Gilbert and Ellice Islands. Imperial Germany established a consulate in 1875, and signed a treaty with various Ralik chiefs. On October 13, 1885, the German gunboat  under Captain Fritz Rötger brought German emissaries to Jaluit. They signed a treaty with Iroijlaplap (paramount chief) Kabua, whom the Germans had earlier recognized as "King of the Ralik Islands", on October 15.

Subsequently, seven other chiefs on seven other islands signed a treaty in German and Marshallese, and a final copy witnessed by Rötger on November 1 was sent to the German Foreign Office. The Germans erected a sign declaring an "Imperial German Protectorate" at Jaluit. It has been speculated that the 1885 crisis over the Carolines with Spain, which almost provoked a war, was in fact "a feint to cover the acquisition of the Marshall Islands", which went almost unnoticed at the time, despite the islands being the largest source of copra in Micronesia. Germany officially purchased the islands from Spain in 1885, after a dispute over commercial and territorial claims in Micronesia; Nauru was added to the German protectorate in 1886.

A new German trading company, the Jaluit Gesellschaft, formed via a merger of all German trading interests, and administered the islands from 1887 until 1906. With a trading monopoly, they pushed out American and British competition and conscripted islanders as laborers. Copra became the dominant industry of the islands, and a head tax of copra was instituted, with the Iroij tasked with collecting the tax in return for a share of the copra. After the German–Spanish Treaty of 1899, in which Germany acquired the Carolines, Palau, and the Marianas from Spain, Germany placed all of its Micronesian islands, including the Marshall Islands, under the governor of German New Guinea.

Catholic missionary Father A. Erdland, from the Missionaries of the Sacred Heart of Hiltrup, Germany, lived on Jaluit from around 1904 to 1914. After conducting considerable research on Marshallese culture and language, he published a 376-page monograph on the islands in 1914. Father H. Linckens, another Missionary of the Sacred Heart, visited the Marshall Islands in 1904 and 1911 for several weeks. He published a small work in 1912 concerning the Catholic mission activities and the people of the Marshall Islands.

The 1914 outbreak of World War I, as well as the passage of time, destroyed all remaining German buildings on the Marshall Islands. The sole surviving German-era wood building in all of Micronesia is the deBrum house on Likiep, built by Joachim deBrum in 1904–05.

Japanese mandate

Under German control, and even before then, Japanese traders and fishermen from time to time visited the Marshall Islands, although contact with the islanders was irregular. After the Meiji Restoration (1868), the Japanese government adopted a policy of turning the Japanese Empire into a great economic and military power in East Asia.

In 1914, Japan joined the Entente during World War I and captured various German Empire colonies, including several in Micronesia. Because Germany had viewed the Marshall Islands purely as an economic colony, they made no attempt to defend or fortify the islands in case of attack. On September 29, 1914, Japanese troops occupied Enewetak, and on September 30, 1914, Jaluit, the administrative centre of the Marshall Islands. After the war, on June 28, 1919, Germany was forced to sign the Treaty of Versailles, renouncing all of its Pacific possessions, including the Marshall Islands. On December 17, 1920, the Council of the League of Nations approved the South Seas Mandate for Japan to take over all former German colonies in the Pacific Ocean located north of the Equator. The administrative center of the Marshall Islands remained on Jaluit.

The German Empire had had primarily economic interests in Micronesia, while the Japanese interests were in land. Despite the Marshall Islands' small area and few resources, the absorption of the territory by Japan would to some extent alleviate Japan's problem of an increasing population with a diminishing amount of available land to house it. During its years of colonial rule, Japan moved more than 1,000 Japanese to the Marshall Islands although they never outnumbered the indigenous peoples as they did in the Mariana Islands and Palau.

The Japanese enlarged administration and appointed local leaders, which weakened the authority of local traditional leaders. Japan also tried to change the social organization in the islands from matrilineality to the Japanese patriarchal system, but with no success. Moreover, during the 1930s, one third of all land up to the high water level was declared the property of the Japanese government. Before Japan banned foreign traders on the archipelago, the activities of Catholic and Protestant missionaries were allowed.

Indigenous people were educated in Japanese schools, and studied the Japanese language and Japanese culture. This policy was the government strategy not only in the Marshall Islands, but on all the other mandated territories in Micronesia. On March 27, 1933, Japan gave notice of withdrawal from the League of Nations, but continued to manage the islands, and in the late 1930s began building air bases on several atolls. The Marshall Islands were in an important geographic position, being the easternmost point in Japan's defensive ring at the beginning of World War II.

World War II

In the months before the attack on Pearl Harbor, Kwajalein Atoll was the administrative center of the Japanese 6th Fleet Forces Service, whose task was the defense of the Marshall Islands.

In World War II, the United States, during the Gilbert and Marshall Islands campaign, invaded and occupied the islands in 1944, destroying or isolating the Japanese garrisons. In just one month in 1944, Americans captured Kwajalein Atoll, Majuro and Enewetak, and, in the next two months, the rest of the Marshall Islands, except for Wotje, Mili, Maloelap and Jaluit.

The battle in the Marshall Islands caused irreparable damage, especially on Japanese bases. During the American bombing, the islands' population suffered from lack of food and various injuries. Of the 5100-man Japanese garrison (2600 Imperial Japanese Navy and 2500 Imperial Japanese Army) on the Mili Atoll only half survived to the end of the war.

Trust Territory of the Pacific Islands

Following capture and occupation by the United States during World War II, the Marshall Islands, along with several other island groups located in Micronesia, passed formally to the United States under United Nations auspices in 1947 as part of the Trust Territory of the Pacific Islands established pursuant to Security Council Resolution 21.

Nuclear testing during the Cold War

From 1946 to 1958, the early years of the Cold War, the United States tested 67 nuclear weapons at its Pacific Proving Grounds located in the Marshall Islands, including the largest atmospheric nuclear test ever conducted by the U.S., code named Castle Bravo. "The bombs had a total yield of 108,496 kilotons, over 7,200 times more powerful than the atomic weapons used during World War II." With the 1952 test of the first U.S. hydrogen bomb, code named "Ivy Mike," the island of Elugelab in the Enewetak atoll was destroyed. In 1956, the United States Atomic Energy Commission regarded the Marshall Islands as "by far the most contaminated place in the world."

Nuclear claims between the U.S. and the Marshall Islands are ongoing, and health effects from these nuclear tests linger.  Project 4.1 was a medical study conducted by the United States of those residents of the Bikini Atoll exposed to radioactive fallout. From 1956 to August 1998, at least $759 million was paid to the Marshallese Islanders in compensation for their exposure to U.S. nuclear weapon testing.

Independence
In 1979, the Government of the Marshall Islands was officially established and the country became self-governing.

In 1986, the Compact of Free Association with the United States entered into force, granting the Republic of the Marshall Islands (RMI) its sovereignty. The Compact provided for aid and U.S. defense of the islands in exchange for continued U.S. military use of the missile testing range at Kwajalein Atoll. The independence procedure was formally completed under international law in 1990, when the UN officially ended the Trusteeship status pursuant to Security Council Resolution 683. The Republic was admitted to the UN in 1991.

In 2003, the US created a new Compact of Free Association for the Republic Marshall Islands and Micronesia, with funding of $3.5 billion to be made over the next 20 years.

21st century

A report in mid 2017 by Stanford University, some 70 years after 23 atomic bombs were detonated on Bikini Atoll, indicates abundant fish and plant life in the coral reefs. That area of the islands was still not habitable by humans, however, due to contamination by radioactivity. A 2012 report by the United Nations had indicated that the contamination was "near-irreversible".

In January 2020, David Kabua, son of founding president Amata Kabua, was elected as the new President of the Marshall Islands. His predecessor Hilda Heine lost the position after a vote.

Climate crisis 

On Christmas morning in 2008, the government declared a state of emergency. In 2013, heavy waves once again breached the city walls of Majuro.

In 2013, the northern atolls of the Marshall Islands experienced drought. This resulted in the failure of food crops and the spread of diseases such as diarrhea, pink eye, and influenza. These emergencies resulted in the United States President declaring an emergency in the islands. This declaration activated support from US government agencies under the Republic's "free association" status with the United States, which provides humanitarian and other vital support.

Following the 2013 emergencies, the Minister of Foreign Affairs Tony deBrum was encouraged by the Obama administration in the United States to turn the crises into an opportunity to promote action against climate change. DeBrum demanded new commitment and international leadership to stave off further climate disasters from battering his country and other similarly vulnerable countries. In September 2013, the Marshall Islands hosted the 44th Pacific Islands Forum summit. DeBrum proposed a Majuro Declaration for Climate Leadership to galvanize concrete action on climate change.

Rising sea levels are threatening the islands. Regardless of the cause, much of the area of the islands may become uninhabitable if the levels become excessive. Major flooding occurred in 2014 leading to a state of emergency for Majuro. Thousands of islanders have already moved to the US over the past decades for medical treatment and for better education or employment, many settling in Arkansas; emigration is likely to increase as sea levels rise. The right of residents to do so ends in 2023 unless the Compact with the US is renewed. The United States Geological Survey in 2014 warned that rising sea levels will salinize the fresh water on the islands, "thus likely forcing inhabitants to abandon their islands in decades, not centuries, as previously thought".

See also
History of Oceania
Politics of the Marshall Islands
Elections in the Marshall Islands
Government of the Marshall Islands

Notes

References

External links
 U.S. State Department Background Note: Marshall Islands